Slash is an English-American hard rock musician. Best known as the lead guitarist of Guns N' Roses (1985–1996 and 2016–present) and Velvet Revolver (2002–2008), he began his solo career in 2009 with the recording of his eponymous debut album. The album featured a range of musicians and vocalists, with the core rhythm section made up of bassist Chris Chaney and drummer Josh Freese. In promotion of the release, Slash toured throughout 2010 and 2011 with vocalist Myles Kennedy (who had recorded two songs for the album), rhythm guitarist Bobby Schneck, bassist Todd Kerns and drummer Brent Fitz. Former Big Wreck bassist Dave Henning was originally planned to be a member of the touring group, but was replaced by Kerns within weeks of the lineup's initial announcement.

After the conclusion of his first solo touring cycle, Slash continued working with Kennedy, Kerns and Fitz on the recording of his second album. Released in 2012, Apocalyptic Love was billed as the first album by "Slash featuring Myles Kennedy and the Conspirators", the new name for the guitarist's backing band. Schneck was not retained for the Apocalyptic Love World Tour, with The Cab's Frank Sidoris announced as his replacement in February 2012. During the promotional tour for 2014's World on Fire, Slash and his band recorded their third live release Live at the Roxy 9.25.14, which was the first to feature Sidoris on guitar. The guitarist became a full member of the band in 2018, when he contributed to his first Slash studio recording, Living the Dream, which was released later in the year.

Official members

Current members

Former members

Other contributors

Session musicians

Touring substitutes

Timeline

Lineups

References

External links
Slash official website

Band members
Slash
Slash band members